Dvor, which translates as Garden from Serbo-Croatian, can refer to:

Places in Bosnia and Herzegovina:
 Dvor, Visoko, a settlement in the Municipality of Visoko

Places in Croatia:
 Dvor, Croatia, a town and a municipality in Croatia

Places in Slovenia:
 Dvor, Ljubljana, a settlement in the City Municipality of Ljubljana
 Dvor, Šmarje pri Jelšah, a settlement in the Municipality of Šmarje pri Jelšah
 Dvor, Šmartno pri Litiji, a settlement in the Municipality of Šmartno pri Litiji
 Dvor, Žužemberk, a settlement in the Municipality of Žužemberk
 Dvor pri Bogenšperku, the name for Dvor, Šmartno pri Litiji from 1953 to 1995
 Dvor pri Polhovem Gradcu, a settlement in the Municipality of Dobrova–Polhov Gradec
 Dravski Dvor, a settlement in the Municipality of Miklavž na Dravskem Polju
 Pesniški Dvor, a settlement in the Municipality of Pesnica
 Stari Dvor, Radeče, a settlement in the Municipality of Radeče

See also
 DVOR
 Gostiny Dvor (disambiguation), a historic Russian term for an indoor market, or shopping center